Rassemblement bleu Marine (RBM) was a French political coalition of right-wing and far-right political parties created by Marine Le Pen in 2012 before the legislative elections. It originally consisted of the National Front, the  Sovereignty, Independence and Liberties (SIEL) party of Paul-Marie Coûteaux, the party Republican Entente (ER) led by Jacques Peyrat, the Republican Gathering (RR) of Jean-Yves Narquin,  Patrie et citoyenneté (the Fatherland and Citizenship party; PeC), and a few other small right-wing political parties and independent politicians. It also has the support of the minor Party of Innocence led by Renaud Camus, although they are not officially part of the coalition. SIEL left the coalition in 2016.

See also
Miscellaneous right

References

Defunct political party alliances in France
Marine Le Pen
National Rally (France)
Right-wing parties in France